Mary Mitzi Lim Cajayon-Uy (born May 6, 1978), also known as Mitch Cajayon-Uy, is a Filipino politician who is the incumbent representative from the 2nd District of Caloocan in the House of Representatives of the Philippines since 2022 and previously from 2007 to 2013. She also served as the executive director of the Council for the Welfare of Children, an attached agency of the Department of Social Welfare and Development from 2017 to 2021. She also served as a city councilor of Caloocan.

Prior to joining politics, Cajayon was named as Miss Caloocan in 2000. She then joined politics as a city councilor of Caloocan from the 2nd district, serving for one term from 2004 to 2007. She was then elected as representative of the 2nd district of Caloocan in 2007; she was re-elected in 2010. In 2009, she was awarded the Award for Congressional Legislative and Service Excellence by the Consumers League of the Philippines Foundation, Inc. However, she was unsuccessful for a third term, losing to outgoing Vice Mayor Edgar Erice, also a former representative himself, in 2013. She attempted a comeback to the Congress in 2016 but lost to Erice once again.

She was appointed the executive director of the Council for the Welfare of Children, an attached agency of the Department of Social Welfare and Development, having been appointed to the post by President Rodrigo Duterte in July 2017. She resigned from the position to run once again for representative at the 2nd district of Caloocan in 2022; she later won the race.

References

 

1978 births
Living people
People from Caloocan
Members of the House of Representatives of the Philippines from Caloocan
Liberal Party (Philippines) politicians
Nationalist People's Coalition politicians
National Unity Party (Philippines) politicians
Metro Manila city and municipal councilors
Lakas–CMD politicians
PDP–Laban politicians
Women members of the House of Representatives of the Philippines
Beauty queen-politicians
Filipino beauty pageant winners
21st-century Filipino women politicians